Tarea Hall Pittman (1903–July 31, 1991) was an American civil rights leader who served as President of the California State Association of Colored Women’s Clubs from 1936 to 1938 and of the California Council of Negro Women from 1948 to 1951, and as Director of the West Coast Region of the NAACP from 1961 to 1965.

Pittman organized protests to force Kaiser Shipyards to hire African Americans in 1941 and 1942, helped desegregate the Oakland Fire Department in 1952, and lobbied successfully for the California Fair Employment Practices Act in 1959 and subsequent laws in Arizona, Alaska, and Nevada.

Throughout her career, Pittman was a frequent host of the Negroes in the News radio program.

In 2015 the Berkeley, California city council voted to rename the city's South Branch Library in Pittman's honor  after a community petition.

References

External links
 Earl Warren Oral History Project: Tarea Hall Pittman, NAACP Official and Civil Rights Worker
 Guide to the Tarea Hall Pittman papers, ca. 1951-1970

1903 births
1991 deaths
People from Bakersfield, California
People from Berkeley, California
San Francisco State University alumni
African-American activists
Activists for African-American civil rights
Activists from California
20th-century African-American women
Women civil rights activists